Christoph Neumann (born 7 November 1964) is a German politician from the Alternative for Germany (Alternative für Deutschland, AfD) party. Neumann has been a member of the Bundestag since 2017.

Life and politics
Neumann was born 1964 in the East German city of Leipzig and became a frontier soldier.
Neumann entered the populist AfD in 2014 and became member of the bundestag after the 2017 German federal election.

References 

1964 births
Living people
Politicians from Leipzig
Members of the Bundestag for Saxony
Members of the Bundestag 2017–2021
Members of the Bundestag for the Alternative for Germany